Harutyun Shmavonyan  (born Shiraz, Persia in 1750 - died Madras, India 1824) was a priest of the Armenian Apostolic Church and the founder of the Armenian journalism through publishing of the Armenian journal "Azdarar". He was also the publication's editor.

Biography
Shmavonyan born in 1750 in the Persian city Shiraz moved in 1784 to Madras (now Chennai), India where he served as an Armenian priest. In 1789, he founded a second Armenian publishing house.

In the October 1794 he founded the Armenian journal "Azdarar". It was the first Armenian periodical publication ever published and Father Shmavonyan is considered a pioneer because of his initiative and father of Armenian journalism. Financing of the new publication had been secured, but the number of readers was not very large. Shmavonyan went on to publish 18 issues of "Azdarar" before it stopped in 1796.

Father Harutyun Shmavonyan died in 1824.

See also
Azdarar
Armenians in India
Armenian printing

External links
Haroutiun Shmavonian in Armeniapedia.org
HyeEtch - ev. Fr. Haruthiun Shmavonian
 Энциклопедия фонда "Хайазг"

Persian Armenians
Indian people of Armenian descent
1750 births
1824 deaths